Kearra Theryes Bastes Jones (born 29 May 2001), known as Kearra Bastes-Jones, is a Filipino association footballer who has played for the Philippines women's national football team.

Bastes-Jones attended Bishop Amat High School in La Puente, California and is part of her school's women's soccer team which competed in the Del Rey League of the CIF Southern Section. She was captain from 2017 to 2018. She was named into the San Gabriel Valley Tribune, Pasadena Star-News, Whittier Daily News Girls Soccer All-Area First Team.

In the club level, prior to entering college, she has played for Crescenta Valley SC.

Bastes-Jones is part of the Philippines women's national football team that participated at the 2018 AFC Women's Asian Cup She started in the Philippines' first match against host Jordan. The match ended in a 2-1 win.

Her mother, Hariett Bastes, traces her roots to Davao.
Starting September 2019 she will play college soccer at UC Santa Barbara.

References

2001 births
Living people
Filipino women's footballers
Philippines women's international footballers
American sportspeople of Filipino descent
Women's association football goalkeepers
People from Duarte, California
Citizens of the Philippines through descent